The Sacchetti family is an Italian noble family originating in Tuscany, now resident in Rome, whose earliest documented member Merlo lived during the late 10th and early 11th centuries. The name of the family is derived from one or more members known as Sacchetto. According to Ugolino di Vieri (1438–1516),"nobile Sacchetti genus est, moenia primus romanus sangius".

In the 19th century, the Sacchetti inherited the title of Prince of Palestrina and permission to use the Barberini name.

History
 
The 17th century author, Eugenio Gamurrini in his Istoria genealogica delle famiglie nobili toscane et umbre (1668–1685) claimed with little evidence that this family, like many others in Florence, had roots in prominent Roman families. He claimed the family derived from the "gens Cornelia", one of the most distinguished families of the Roman Republic, from who arose in 485 BC the consul Servius Cornelius Cossus Maluginensis. According to Gamurrini the Sacchetti descend from the Cornelii Merulae branch.

The family was certainly well established in Florence during the 12th century. Dante Alighieri mentions the family in The Divine Comedy, Paradise Canto XVI in which Dante's great-grandfather, Cacciaguida degli Elisei (c.1098 – c. 1148), lists the ancient families of Florence In The Inferno, Canto XXIX:1–36, Dante recounted meeting his father's first cousin, Geri del Bello. He had been condemned to the ninth chasm for his disputes with the Sacchetti, most likely Brodaio Sacchetti, consul in 1203. At the time of Dante's vision the feud had not been settled. The families were finally reconciled in 1342.

Branches

Florentine Branch 
According to Ugolino di Vieri the Sacchetti were among the families forced to relocate from Fiesole to Florence after the former was conquered in 1125. In 1137, the earliest document asserts Sacchetto and his brother Bernardino di Bonizo di Merlo contract a tower association with the Uberti family.(Strozziane Uguccioni, August 11, 1137). It was the descendants of Sacchetto that would eventually use this as a patronymic and become known as the Sacchetti. In 1197, Brodaio di Sacchetto was elected to the Council of the Florentine Republic. and in 1202, Consul. While Cingisallo and Albizzo di Rovinoso are listed among the Anziani for the year 1200. When Florentine society was divided between the political factions of the Guelf and the Ghibellines most members of the family sided with the Guelf party. In 1260 the Teghiaio and Giambeto Sacchetti fought in the Battle of Montaperti against Ghibelline Siena while Gaglia di Upizzino Sacchetti was one of the men charged with defending the Carroccio, a wheeled altar which was the rallying point for a medieval army. The Sienese defeated the Florentines and the Sacchetti were exiled but later returned with the eventual defeat of the Sienese and the final expulsion of the Florentine Ghibellines. Despite the family's support for Guelf party, the Sacchetti were barred from public office in the Ordinances of Justice in 1293 and 1295. The ordinances were intended to exclude Ghibelline sympathizers and nobles with a reputation for their bellicose nature and a predilection for violence to impose their will. Eventually the family returned to the council and the highest offices of the Republic. Antonio di Forese Sacchetti was appointed by the Signoria on July 7, 1375 as one of the eight members of a committee, that became known as the "Otto dei Preti" (Eight Priests), to carry out the taxation of the clergy in Florence and Fiesole. The tax was a forced loan to pay for the nonaggression pact with the mercenary Sir John Hawkwood at a cost of 130,000 florins. Antonio with the other members were excommunicated by Pope Gregory XI.   The family has two main branches, one that remained in Florence up to the time of the hegemony of the Medici and relocated to Rome in the sixteenth century and the Neapolitan branch that went into the service of the Normans in southern Italy shortly after their forced transfer from Fiesole.

Neapolitan Branch 
The Neapolitan branch descended from two brother, Lancillotto and Avellino di Sacchetto. Lancillotto's son Cesare was Bishop of Melfi. Ottone Sacchetti was the Latin Patriarch of Antioch. Avellino received privileges from the Norman King Roger II of Sicily and created Gran Giustiziere of the kingdom. Later generations of this line included Gezzolino di Simone di Avellino, created Baron of Alessano in 1173 by King William the Good. Gezzolino also held the baronages of Ceglia, Campia, Cavallino, Sellino, Ginosa, Castrignano, Levarano, Maladregno, Muflafia, Oira and Squinzano. Gezzolino's son Ludovcio was married to Emilia Acciaioli who bore him three sons: Angelo, Iacopo and Alberico, who was the Praetor of Tuscolano in 1224 for the Emperor Frederick II. Pietro Antonio di Agnelo, Knight of the Golden Spur, Governor of the city of L'Aquila for King Charles II of Anjou in 1285. Giovanni Pietro was theGran Giustiziere of Abruzzo in 1268. Lazzarino, the son of Pietro Antonio was appointed the Quartermaster General for Abruzzo by Charles II in 1299. Andrea Guido, nicknamed Guidotto was appointed as replacement Governor of Salerno by King Robert of Naples in 1338 due to the Governor being absent for war negotiations. Guidotto was married to Cecilia Brancacci. They had at least three sons: Carlo, Andrea and Filippo. Carlo, Baron of San Demetrio and Policastrello and his wife Isabella De Aloe contracted a marriage for his son Giromlamo to Laudomia de Tufo on 4 April 1412. Giromino and Laudomia de Tufo had two sons: Alfonso and Matteo. Queen Giovanna II appointed Alfonso a Governor in the province of Calabria Citra. Alfonso's son Giovanni Alfonsino was granted privileges by King Alfonso II in 1453. Pietro Antonio appointed Quartermaster of Cosenza by Ferdinand of Aragon in 1483. Alessandro marchese di S. Quirico, Foggia, Apulia. Francesco Antonio Sacchetti, born 1595 in San Severo, Foggia, Puglia was appointed bishop of San Severo 1 October 1635, and consecrated on 7 October 1635 by Cardinal Giulio Cesare Sacchetti. On 13 January 1648 he was appointed bishop of Troia, Foggia, Puglia and died in that office in June 1662.

Roman Branch 
The Roman branch is descended from Giovanni Battista Sacchetti, the son of Matteo Sacchetti and Nanna Carducci. He was a trading partner of the Barberini family of Pope Urban VIII and married Francesca Altoviti, the daughter of Alessandro Altoviti. The marriage had the effect of transferring to the Sacchetti financial resources, property, profitable links with the curia and client relations already established by the Altoviti. They move to Rome from Florence and together they had nine children Matteo (died young), Bindo, Vincenzo, Clarice, Sandrina, Marcello, Alessandro, Ottavia, Matteo, Gianfrancesco and Giulio Cesare. Giulio Cesare became an influential cardinal, and in 1644 and 1655 included in the French Court's list of acceptable candidates for the Papacy.  Gianfrancesco was the Commissary General of the Papal troops in Valtellina in 1623 and 1626; and was created Marquis of Rigattini in 1632 and a Marquis of the Baldachin in 1633 giving him the rank of Prince at the papal court. The current Roman branch is descendant from Matteo and his wife Cassandra Ricasoli-Rucellai. Their son Don Giovanni Battista and Caterina Acciaioli inherited his uncle's title and their son Matteo who married Chiara Orsini exchanged the Marquisate of Castel Rigattini for the Marquisate of Castel Romano. Their son Giulio married Maddalena Azzan. Their son Scipione became the Chief Quartermaster of the Apostolic Palaces in 1794, a title held by the family until the dissolution of the papal court in the 1968. Scipione married Eleonora Cenci Bolognetti daughter of Girolamo Prince of Vicovaro. Their son Urbano married Beatrice Orsini, daughter of Domenico Duke of Gravina and Principe of Solofra and Maria Luisa Torlonia of the Dukes of Poli and Guadagnolo. Their younger son Luigi married Maria Colonna-Barberini, Princess and heiress of Palestrina and with a decree from the Italian state Luigi assumed his wife's titles and assumed the surname Barberini. The eldest son of Urbano and Beatrice Orsini, Giulio married Teresa, the daughter of the Marquis Antonio Gerini and his wife Anna Maria Borghese. Their son Giovanni Battista was a Councilor to the State of the Vatican and married Matilda Lante Montefeltro della Rovere. Their son Giulio, the last Chief Quartermaster of the Vatican, married Giovannella Emo Capodilista, the daughter of the Count Alvise and Maria Henriqueta Alvares Pereira de Mello of the Dukes of Cadaval. Giulio and Giovannella had five children. The current head of the family is their son Urbano.  

A Lecture" The Sacchetti as Art Patrons during the 17th century. (in Italian) :“Gli Illustrissimi Signori Sacchetti Padroni” Il mecenatismo della famiglia Sacchetti e Pietro da Cortona 21 ottobre 2015 Nam Accademia Nazionale di San Luca.

Sacchetti-Barberini-Colonna, Princes of Palestrina 

Cornelia Barberini, the daughter of Urbano Barberini and Maria Teresa Boncompagni, was the heiress and last of the Barberini. Cornelia married Giulio Cesare Colonna di Sciarra. This line became known as Barberini-Colonna. The last of this line was Maria, daughter of Prince Enrico Barberini-Colonna and Teresa Orsini. Maria became the heiress of the Barberini-Colonna. Maria married Luigi Sacchetti, son of the Marchese Don Urbano and Donna Beatrice Orsini. Luigi assumed the title of Prince of Palestrina and the name Sacchetti-Barberini, today known as the Barberini, Princes of Palestrina.

Notable Members 
Poet Franco Sacchetti (1335–1400), Italian poet and novelist, best known for his Novelle (short stories)

Francesco Sacchetti (died in or before 1473), acclaimed doctor of medicine and professor of logic and law.

Cardinal Giulio Cesare Sacchetti (1586–1663), nominated twice by France for Pope in 1644 and 1655

Cardinal Urbano Sacchetti (1640–1705)

References

Sacchetti
 Noble families
Families of Florence